Great Barr Hall is an 18th-century mansion situated at Pheasey, Walsall, on the border with Great Barr,  Birmingham, West Midlands, England. It has associations with the Lunar Society and is a Grade II listed building. It is, however, in a very poor state of repair and is on the Buildings at Risk Register.

History

The Scotts
In the mid-17th century, Richard Scott acquired the house then standing on the site and known as Nether House. In about 1777, Joseph Scott (later Sir Joseph Scott, 1st Baronet Scott of Great Barr) replaced the old house with a two-storey, nine-bay mansion in the Strawberry Hill Gothic Revival style. The house was much altered and extended about 1840 and in 1863, an adjacent chapel (which was never consecrated) was erected to a design probably of architect George Gilbert Scott, a friend – but not a relation – of Sir Francis Scott. Two of the extant lodge houses are believed to be by George Gilbert Scott.

Outside the chapel are the burial plots of several of Lady Bateman Scott's pets, inscribed with poems she wrote for them.

Financial problems led the Scott Family (who gave their name to the nearby Scott Arms pub and shopping centre), to lease out the hall from about 1788 to Samuel Galton, and for some years the Hall became a venue for meetings of the Lunar Society. It is said to be the 'favourite place of meeting' of this illustrious body. In 1999, stone memorials to the Lunar Society, the "Moonstones", were erected at the nearby Asda supermarket.

In 1791, Sir Francis Scott, 3rd Baronet, inherited the manor of Great Barr from his maternal uncle Thomas Hoo and was able to return to live in the house on the expiry of the lease. He died in 1863. His widow Mildred lived on in the Hall until her death in 1909.

After the Scotts

In 1911, the estate was purchased by a local hospital board and, in 1918, became St Margaret's Mental Hospital. Many detached hospital buildings were erected near the hall, and in the 1980s the grounds became a nature reserve, managed by the Staffordshire Nature Conservation Trust but the hall itself was abandoned in 1978 and, despite its 1971 Grade II* listing, was left to decay. The hospital began to close in phases from the late 1980s. The male department closed during 1992 but the female department closed in March 1997. The final residents, those with high dependency, left a newer part of the site in 2004.

This also included a special school, The Queslett School, which closed in December 1988.

Many years passed during which discussions and negotiations for the protection of the hall came to nothing. In 2006, Bovis Homes purchased the 40 hectare estate and obtained planning permission for the redevelopment of the site. Nether Hall Park a new residential housing development, occupying a substantial part of the estate, was completed in the 2010s.

In May 2011 the hall, still in ruins, was put up for sale for £2.2 million, by the Manor Building Preservation Trust, who had been allowed to purchase it nine years earlier for £900,000. The trust had failed to bring it back into a safe state. It failed to sell, and so was offered for sale by auction on 6 February 2012, by Van Weenan Estate Agents of London, with a guide price of £1,250,000. The highest bid was £1,140,000, and so it again remained unsold. In May 2012, it was sold to a consortium of ten local residents. They have commissioned Lapworth Architects to consult with the public and investigate potential new uses for the hall.

The hall is on English Heritage's "Buildings at Risk Register".

Lodges 

The Hall had six lodges, or gatehouses. Three survive:

 Avenue Lodge, on Chapel Lane
 Handsworth Lodge, where Handsworth Drive meets Queslett Road
 Walsall Lodge (now known as Merrions Wood Lodge), on Birmingham Road; designed by George Gilbert Scott in 1858

and three are lost:

 Beacon Lodge, on Beacon Road, near the junction with Waverly Avenue (approx. )
 Church Lodge, opposite Avenue Lodge across Chapel Lane (approx. )
 Queslett Lodge, near where Queslett Road meets Beacon Road (approx. )

Lakes

A pair of large, man-made lakes—now known as Great Barr Hall Upper Lake and Great Barr Hall Lower Lake—are in the grounds of the hall, on two levels, separated by a cascade which is crossed by stepping stones. The upper lake is fed by a stream, the Holbrook, which leaves the lower lake leaves it at the southern end, and runs, via Perry Reservoir, to the River Tame, very near the Zig Zag Bridge at Perry Barr. From there, its waters flow, via the Trent, to the Humber and the North Sea.

References

External links 

Photos of the derelict Great Barr Hall and St Margaret's Hospital
Great Barr Hall Action Committee
the Scotts of Great Barr
Great Barr Hall put up for sale

Country houses in the West Midlands (county)
Grade II listed buildings in the West Midlands (county)
Lunar Society of Birmingham
Buildings and structures in Walsall
Great Barr